The 1980 Kangaroo Tour of New Zealand was a mid-season tour of New Zealand by the Australia national rugby league team. The Australians played seven matches on tour, including a two test series against the New Zealand national rugby league team. The tour began on 1 June and finished on 17 June.

Leadership
As he had been since 1978, Frank Stanton was the coach of the Australian team. Canterbury-Bankstwon hooker, Greek born George Peponis, was the tour captain.

Touring squad
The squad was made up mostly of those playing in the Sydney Premiership. Although not the only Queenslander in the squad, Chris Close was the sole player selected from Queensland after his Man of the Match performance in the experimental 1980 State of Origin game.

|- bgcolor="#CCCCFF"
| Player
| Club
| Position(s)
| Games
| Tests
| Tries
| Goals
| F/Goals
| Points
|-
|- bgcolor="#FFFFFF"
| Chris Anderson
|  Canterbury-Bankstown
| 
| 
| 2
| 
| 
| 
| 
|-
|- bgcolor="#FFFFFF"
| Kerry Boustead
|  Eastern Suburbs
| 
| 
| 1
| 
| 
| 
| 
|-
|- bgcolor="#FFFFFF"
| Les Boyd
|  Manly-Warringah
| 
| 
| 2
| 
| 
| 
| 
|-
|- bgcolor="#FFFFFF"
| Greg Brentnall
|  Canterbury-Bankstown
| 
| 
| 2
| 
| 
| 
| 
|-
|- bgcolor="#FFFFFF"
| Chris Close
|  Redcliffe
| 
| 
| –
| 
| 
| 
| 
|-
|- bgcolor="#FFFFFF"
| Michael Cronin
|  Parramatta
| 
| 
| 2
| 
| 
| 
| 
|-
|- bgcolor="#FFFFFF"
| Garry Dowling
|  Parramatta
| 
| 
| 2
| 
| 
| 
| 
|-
|- bgcolor="#FFFFFF"
| Rod Morris
|  Balmain
| 
| 
| 2
| 
| 
| 
| 
|-
|- bgcolor="#FFFFFF"
| George Peponis (c)
|  Canterbury-Bankstown
| 
| 
| 2
| 
| 
| 
| 
|-
|- bgcolor="#FFFFFF"
| Ray Price
|  Parramatta
| 
| 
| 2
| 
| 
| 
| 
|-
|- bgcolor="#FFFFFF"
| Graham Quinn
|  St George
| 
| 
| 1
| 
| 
| 
| 
|-
|- bgcolor="#FFFFFF"
| Tommy Raudonikis
|  Newtown
| 
| 
| 2
| 
| 
| 
| 
|-
|- bgcolor="#FFFFFF"
| Rod Reddy
|  St George
| 
| 
| 2
| 
| 
| 
| 
|-
|- bgcolor="#FFFFFF"
| Alan Thompson
|  Manly-Warringah
| 
| 
| 2
| 
| 
| 
| 
|-
|- bgcolor="#FFFFFF"
| Graeme Wynn
|  St George
| 
| 
| –
| 
| 
| 
| 
|- bgcolor="#FFFFFF"
| Craig Young
|  St George
| 
| 
| 2
| 
| 
| 
| 
|-

Tour
The Australian's played seven games on the tour, winning five, losing one with one drawn game.

1st Test

2nd Test

Statistics
Largest Test Attendance
 12,321 - First test vs New Zealand at Carlaw Park

Largest non-test Attendance
 14,000 - Australia vs Auckland at Carlaw Park

References

Australia national rugby league team tours
Rugby league tours of New Zealand
Kangaroo tour of New Zealand
Kangaroo tour of New Zealand